Major-General John Keith Edwards  (born 1896) was a senior British Army officer.

Military career
Edwards was commissioned into the Scots Guards in 1915. He served in First World War and was awarded the Military Cross. He went on to become an instructor at the Staff College, Quetta in India in 1936 and a staff officer in Palestine and Transjordan in 1939 during the  Arab revolt there. In the Second World War he served as Brigadier on the general staff at East Africa Command from 1940, commander of the 148th Independent Brigade in 1942 and General Officer Commanding 45th Infantry Division from 1943. His last appointment was as Head of the SHAEF Mission to the Netherlands before retiring in 1947.

References

Bibliography

External links
Generals of World War II

1896 births
Academics of the Staff College, Quetta
Year of death unknown
British Army major generals
British Army generals of World War II
Companions of the Distinguished Service Order
Officers of the Order of the British Empire
Recipients of the Military Cross
Scots Guards officers
British Army personnel of World War I
Graduates of the Staff College, Camberley
British military personnel of the 1936–1939 Arab revolt in Palestine